Westringia cheelii is a species of plant in the mint family that is endemic to Australia.

Description
The species grows as a spreading shrub to 0.3–1.5 m in height. The oval leaves are 3–7 mm long and 1.2–2 mm wide. The flowers are white, with purplish to brownish dots, appearing from August to November.

Distribution and habitat
The species occurs in northern New South Wales and southern Queensland, on deep, gravel-rich, sandy soils, in mallee woodland and dry sclerophyll forest.

References

cheelii
Lamiales of Australia
Flora of New South Wales
Flora of Queensland
Taxa named by Joseph Maiden
Taxa named by Ernst Betche
Plants described in 1910